The Barrandeoceratidae is a family of coiled nautiloids included in the Tarphycerida (sensu lato) that lived from the Middle Ordovician to the Middle Devonian, characterised by mostly compressed shells with a subcentral siphuncle composed of thin-walled segments that may become secondarily ventral.(Flower and Kummel 1950, Sweet 1964).

The Barrandeoceratidae are derived from the tarphyceratid genus, Centrotarphyceras through Barrandeoceras (Flower 1984), and is the source for the  Uranoceratidae and Nephriticeratidae. These three families form the barrandeoceratid group. Sometimes a fourth family, the Bickmoritidae, is added, based on the genus Bickmorites.

Genera (Flower 1984) include Barrandeoceras, Centrocyrtoceras, Paquettoceras, Savageoceras,  Gasconsoceras, Haydenoceras, and Paraplectoceras; and if included, Bickmorites. Avilionella and Laureloceras, included in the Barrandeocerida in the Treatise on Invertebrate Paleontology Part K (1964) have been removed to the Plectoceratidae.

References

Flower, R.H. & Kummel, B. 1950. A Classification of the Nautiloidea. Journal of Paleontology vol 24, no.5, pp604–616, Sept 1950.
Flower, R.H. 1984, Bodeiceras, a New Mohawkian Oxycone, with Revision of the Older Barrandeoceratida, and Discussion of the Status of the Order. Journal of Paleontology vol 58, no. 6, pp1372–1379, Nov 1984.
Sweet, Walter C, 1964. Nautiloidea - Barrandeocerida, in Treatise on Invertebrate Paleontology, Part K, Geol Soc of America, Teichert & Moore,(eds)

Prehistoric nautiloid families
Middle Ordovician first appearances
Middle Devonian extinctions
Tarphycerida